The W. L. Foley Building at 214-218 Travis St. in Houston, Texas was originally built in 1860 and reconstructed after a fire in 1889.  The reconstruction was designed by architect Eugene T. Heiner. The building was listed on the National Register of Historic Places in 1978. It burned a second time in 1989 and was reconstructed by artist and architect Lee Benner in 1994.

References

Commercial buildings on the National Register of Historic Places in Texas
Commercial buildings completed in 1860
Buildings and structures in Houston
Buildings and structures in Harris County, Texas
National Register of Historic Places in Houston
Recorded Texas Historic Landmarks